Mount Keltie is a mountain  high, midway between Mount Kosko and Mount Chalmers in the Conway Range of Antarctica. It was discovered by the British National Antarctic Expedition (1901–04) and named for Sir John Scott Keltie, Secretary of the Royal Geographical Society, 1892–1915.

References

Mountains of Oates Land